The Saturn V-C, was just like the Saturn V-B, studied in the same year as the V-C, except it would use a S-IVB second stage to get a payload into a higher orbit. A Centaur third stage was optional for deep space missions.

References 

 Lowther, Scott, Saturn: Development, Details, Derivatives and Descendants, Work in progress. Available chapters may be ordered directly from Scott Lowther at web site indicated. Accessed at: https://saemobilus.sae.org/content/680358

Saturn (rocket family)